HMS Victorious was the third Illustrious-class aircraft carrier after Illustrious and Formidable.  Ordered under the 1936 Naval Programme, she was laid down at the Vickers-Armstrong shipyard at Newcastle upon Tyne in 1937 and launched two years later in 1939. Her commissioning was delayed until 1941 due to the greater need for escort vessels for service in the Battle of the Atlantic.

Her service in 1941 and 1942 included famous actions against the battleship Bismarck, several Arctic convoys, and Operation Pedestal. She was loaned to the United States Navy in 1943 and served in the south west Pacific as part of the Third Fleet. Victorious contributed to several attacks on the Tirpitz. The elimination of the German naval threat allowed her redeployment first to the Eastern Fleet at Colombo and then to the Pacific for the final actions of the war against Japan.

After the war, her service was broken by periods in reserve and, between 1950 and 1958, the most complete reconstruction of any Royal Navy carrier. This involved the construction of new superstructure above the hangar deck level, a new angled flight deck, new boilers and the fitting of Type 984 radar and data links and heavy shipboard computers, able to track 50 targets and assess their priority for interrogation and interception. The reduction of Britain's naval commitment in 1967, the end of the Indonesia–Malaysia confrontation, and a fire while under refit, prompted her final withdrawal from service, three to five years early, and she was scrapped in 1969.

World War II

Bismarck episode
Just two weeks after commissioning in 1941, Victorious took part in the hunt for the German battleship Bismarck in the North Atlantic.  Originally intended to be part of the escort for Convoy WS 8B to the Middle East, she was hardly ready to be involved in the hunt for Bismarck with only a quarter of her aircraft complement embarked. Sailing with the battleship , the battlecruiser HMS Repulse and 4 light cruisers,  Victorious was hastily deployed to assist in the pursuit.

On 24 May 1941, Victorious launched nine of her biplane Fairey Swordfish torpedo bomber aircraft and two Fulmar fighters. The Swordfish, affectionately known by their crews as "Stringbags", under the command of Eugene Esmonde flew through foul weather and attacked Bismarck in the face of tremendous fire from anti-aircraft guns, scoring a hit to the armoured belt with a torpedo. No aircraft were shot down during the attack, but the Fulmars ran out of fuel on the return journey and had to ditch in the sea as the ship's homing beacon had failed.  Victorious took no further part in the chase; aircraft from Ark Royal disabled Bismarcks steering gear, thus contributing to her sinking three days later.  Esmonde received a DSO for his part in the action.

Convoy and other Arctic duties
In early June 1941, while part of the escort for troop convoy WS 8X, a Swordfish of 825 Squadron from Victorious located the German supply ship Gonzenheim north of the Azores. Gonzenheim had been intended to support the Bismarck but was subsequently scuttled when approached by British warships. On 5 June, Victorious was detached to Gibraltar, and with Ark Royal and a naval escort,  "flew-off" Hawker Hurricane aircraft to reinforce the besieged British Mediterranean base of Malta (Operation Tracer). Victorious returned to the naval base at Scapa Flow with captured crewmen from Gonzenheim.

In late July 1941, she escorted HMS Adventure via the Arctic to Murmansk with a load of mines.  On 31 July she took part in the raid on Kirkenes and Petsamo, in which thirteen of her aircraft were lost.

During early September, she launched more air attacks: against Tromsø (twice), against Vestfjorden, and against shipping off Bodø. On 13 September, aircraft from Victorious sank the Norwegian Hurtigruten coastal steamer Barøy.

In October 1941, decrypted German Enigma signals indicated a break-out into the Atlantic by the German warships Scheer and Tirpitz.  Victorious was deployed with the Home Fleet for their interception; this included a patrol in the Denmark Strait with battleships , USS Idaho, and USS Mississippi, and cruisers USS Wichita and USS Tuscaloosa. This joint Anglo-American operation pre-dated the formal state of war between the United States and Germany. This operation continued until mid-November, when Hitler cancelled the German operation. Victorious then continued with the Home Fleet until March 1942.

Victorious returned to the Arctic Convoys in March and April 1942, helping to provide cover for convoys PQ 12, QP 8, PQ 13, QP 9, PQ 14, and QP 10. During these operations, she also made an unsuccessful air strike on Tirpitz, losing two aircraft. From the end of April, until June, Anglo-American forces (including the US ships Washington, Tuscaloosa, and Wichita) covered convoys PQ 16, QP 12, PQ 17, and QP 13, after which Victorious returned to Scapa Flow.

The Arctic convoys had been suspended temporarily after the heavy losses suffered by Convoy PQ 17 when twenty-three out of thirty-six ships were sunk.  This was after the convoy had been scattered in the belief that an attack was imminent by the German warships Admiral Hipper, Lützow, Admiral Scheer, and Tirpitz.

Pedestal

The suspension of the Arctic convoys released Victorious to take part in a "last chance" attempt to resupply Malta – Operation Pedestal. Exercises (Operation Berserk) were performed with aircraft carriers , Furious, Eagle and Argus to improve operational techniques.

Pedestal began on 10 August 1942 and involved a great array of ships in several coordinated groups; two battleships, four aircraft carriers, seven cruisers and thirty two destroyers. Some of the carriers were transporting aircraft for Malta's defence and fourteen merchant ships carried supplies. On 12 August 1942 Victorious was slightly damaged by an attack from Italian bombers. Eagle was less fortunate, being torpedoed and sunk by a German U-boat on her return journey to Gibraltar. Ultimately Pedestal was a success for the allies: supplies, including oil and reinforcing Supermarine Spitfires allowed Malta to hold out, albeit at the cost of the loss of nine merchant ships, one aircraft carrier, two cruisers, and a destroyer.

In September 1942, Victorious was taken in hand for a refit that included the installation of an aircraft direction room. After trials, she was ready to participate in the North African landings.

Operation Torch

In November 1942, Victorious took part in the North African landings. Operation Torch, which involved 196 ships of the Royal Navy and 105 of the United States Navy, landed about 107,000 Allied soldiers. Ultimately successful, Operation Torch was the precursor to the later invasions of Sicily, Italy and France. Victorious provided air cover during the landings and made air attacks at Algiers and Fort Duree. Four of her Grumman F4F Wildcat fighters landed at Blida airfield to accept its surrender.

The submarine's structure was badly damaged and she was scuttled; surviving crew were rescued by HMS Opportune.

Service with the US Navy
In late December 1942, Victorious was loaned to the US Navy after an American plea for carrier reinforcement. Whilst in US service she was known as the USS Robin. After a refit in the United States at the Norfolk Navy Yard in January 1943 and the addition of Avenger aircraft, Victorious passed through the Panama Canal on 14 February to operate with United States forces in the Pacific. Her crew suffered an outbreak of diphtheria and medical supplies were dropped to her by air on 21 February.

Victorious arrived at Pearl Harbor in March 1943 and was fitted with heavier arrester wires as RN wires had proved too light for the Grumman Avenger aircraft. Additional AA guns were also fitted. She sailed for the south-west Pacific, arriving at Nouméa, New Caledonia, on 17 May to form Carrier Division 1 with USS Saratoga. She sortied immediately for a week with Task Force 14, including Saratoga and battleships North Carolina, Massachusetts, and Indiana, sweeping against reported Japanese fleet activity, but without contact. Six aircraft were lost to accidents.  Rear Admiral DeWitt Ramsey, commanding the division, carried out evaluation exercises and patrol sweeps in June and determined that Victorious had superior fighter control but handled Avenger aircraft poorly because of their weight. Accordingly, he transferred 832 Squadron FAA to the Saratoga and US Carrier Air Group 3 to the Victorious. Thereafter, Victoriouss primary role was fighter cover and Saratoga mainly handled strikes. 

On 27 June, TF14 was redesignated Task Group 36.3 and sailed to provide cover for the invasion of New Georgia (part of Operation Cartwheel). Returning to Nouméa on 25 July, Victorious was recalled home. Though the Japanese had four carriers to Ramsey's two, it seemed clear that they were not intending to press their advantage and the first two carriers of the new Essex class had arrived at Pearl Harbor well ahead of schedule. Victorious left for Pearl Harbor on 31 July, leaving behind her Avengers as replacements for Saratoga, sailing in company with battleship Indiana and launching 165 anti submarine sweeps en route. She also carried US pilots finishing their tours as well as two Japanese POWs. After a brief stop in San Diego, Victorious passed through the Panama Canal on 26 August and arrived at Norfolk Navy Yard 1 September, where specialized US equipment was removed. Returning home, she arrived at Greenock on the Clyde on 26 September 1943 where aircraft and stores were discharged awaiting refit.

Attack on Tirpitz
From December 1943 until March 1944, Victorious was under refit at Liverpool, where new radar was fitted. At the end of March, Victorious with Anson and Duke of York formed Force 1, covering the passage of Convoy JW 58. This involved Barracudas in two waves, hitting the battleship fourteen times and strafing the ship's defences. Although near-misses caused flooding and there was serious damage to the superstructure, the ship's armour was not penetrated. Nonetheless, the attack put Tirpitz out of action for some months. The Task Force returned to Scapa Flow three days later.

Victorious was to participate in three further attacks on Tirpitz, in April and May (Operations Planet, Brawn, and Tiger Claw), but these were cancelled due to bad weather and anti-shipping strikes were substituted. On 30 May, an acoustic torpedo attack by  against Victorious failed and subsequently she made more shipping attacks off Norway (Operation Lombard).

Eastern Fleet

In June 1944, Victorious, in company with HMS Indomitable, left British waters to join the Eastern Fleet at Colombo, Ceylon (now Sri Lanka), where she arrived on 5 July. The Eastern Fleet, after a quiet period of trade protection and relative vulnerability, was now being reinforced with ships released from the Atlantic and Mediterranean, in preparation for offensive action against the Japanese.

After a short preparatory period, Victorious took part in a sequence of air attacks against Japanese installations. The first was Operation Crimson on 25 July, a joint attack with HMS Illustrious on airfields near Sabang in Sumatra. In late August, she provided air cover for Eastern Fleet ships that were providing air-sea rescue facilities for US Army aircraft during air attacks on Sumatra (Operation Boomerang). On 29 August, in company with HMS Illustrious and Indomitable and escorted by HMS Howe, Victorious made air strikes on Padang, Indaroeng and Emmahaven (Operation Banquet). After a short pause, on 18 September, Victorious and Indomitable attacked railway yards at Sigli in Sumatra followed by photo-reconnaissance of the Nicobar Islands (Operation Light). During Light, there was a "friendly fire" attack on HMS Spirit, fortunately without causing any casualties.

At the end of September, Victorious had a short interval at Bombay for repairs to her steering gear to remedy problems that had arisen during Operation Light. She rejoined the Eastern Fleet on 6 October. The next operation, Millet, was her last with the Eastern Fleet. On 17 October, she launched attacks on the Nicobar Islands and Nancowry harbour, with HMS Indomitable and escorted by HMS Renown. Enemy air attacks destroyed four aircraft and damaged five more. During early November, Victorious returned to Bombay for more work on her steering as more problems had arisen during Millet.

British Pacific Fleet

Sumatra
The British Pacific Fleet (BPF) was formed at Trincomalee on 22 November 1944 from elements of the Eastern Fleet and Victorious was transferred to the new fleet. From November 1944 until January 1945 the BPF stayed in the Indian Ocean, training and gaining experience that they would need when working with the United States Navy. Victorious, however, remained under repair at Bombay until January 1945 and missed raids on oil refineries at Pangkalan Brandan (Operation Robson).

In early January 1945, she was available for Operation Lentil, a repeat raid on the oil refineries at Pangkalan Brandan with HM Ships Indomitable and Implacable. Further raids on Japanese oil and port installations in Sumatra were made on 16 January. By late January, the BPF had finally quit Ceylon and was en route to its new home base in Sydney. The voyage was interrupted on 24 January for another series of raids, this time on Pladjoe and Manna in south west Sumatra (Operation Meridian) during which there was little opposition from Japanese aircraft. This was followed on 29 January by unsuccessful attacks on oil installations at Soengi-Gerong. This time, the Japanese attempted air attacks on the British fleet but these were beaten off.  Total aircraft losses by all carriers were 16 aircraft in action and another 25 lost by ditching or on landing.  Nine Fleet Air Arm pilots captured by the Japanese were executed in April 1945.

Okinawa

In early February, Victorious joined Task Force 113 (TF113) at Sydney to prepare for service with the US 5th Fleet. At the end of the month, TF113 left Sydney for their forward base at Manus Island, north of New Guinea, and then continued, joining the 5th US Fleet at Ulithi on 25 March as Task Force 57 (TF57), supporting the American assault on Okinawa. The task allocated to the British force was to neutralise airfields in the Sakishima Gunto. From late March until 25 May, the British carriers Victorious, Illustrious (later replaced by Formidable), Indefatigable and Indomitable formed the 1st Aircraft Carrier Squadron commanded by Vice Admiral Philip Vian and they were in action against airfields on the Sakishima Islands (Operations Iceberg I and Iceberg II) and Formosa (Operation Iceberg Oolong).

The British carriers were attacked by kamikaze suicide aircraft and Victorious was hit on 4 and 9 May and near-missed on 1 April, but her armoured flight deck resisted the worst of the impacts.  She remained on station and was back in operation within hours on each occasion, despite damage to an aircraft lift and steam piping in her superstructure. Three men were killed and 19 of the ship's company were injured.

Japan
After May 1945 the British Pacific Fleet withdrew to Sydney and Manus for refits and, in the cases of Victorious, Formidable and Indefatigable, for repairs to battle damage. The British fleet rendezvoused with the US 3rd Fleet on 16 July and became effectively absorbed into the American structure as a part of TF38 for the "softening up" of Japanese resistance within their home islands.

During the second half of July, aircraft from Victorious took part in a series of attacks on Japanese shipping, transport and airbases on Honshu and around the Inland Sea. In one notable attack in July, aircraft of 849 Squadron from Victorious located the Japanese escort carrier Kaiyo at Beppu Bay in Kyūshū and attacked her, inflicting serious damage that kept the ship out of the remainder of the war. In the main, however, British aircraft were excluded from the actions against the major Japanese naval bases; the Americans, for political reasons, preferred to reserve these targets for themselves.

War's end
Victorious was scheduled to leave for Manus Island with Task Force 37 (TF37) on 10 August 1945 to prepare for the anticipated invasion of Japan (Operation Olympic), and actually left on August 12, then proceeding to Sydney. The surrender of Japan on 15 August rendered the invasion moot. The British Pacific Fleet (BPF) commander had agreed to stay for one more day's operations, but the British arrangements could not stretch to a further delay and fuel shortages were insurmountable. The steering faults that had hampered Victorious in the Indian Ocean in late 1944 are believed to have continued.

On 31 August, Victoriouss ship's company took part in the Victory Parade in Sydney.

Post-war

Victorious left Australia in September 1945, arrived back in Britain on 27 October and undertook three trips to collect servicemen and war brides of British servicemen from Australia and the Far East. In the winter of 1946–47, the first deck trials with the Hawker Sea Fury (Mark 10) took place aboard Victorious, leading to its approval for carrier operations in early 1947.

Victorious was reduced to the reserve at Devonport on 15 January 1947, on completion of her trooping duties. From June that year she was modified at Portsmouth Dockyard with additional accommodation and classrooms and on 1 October 1947, joined the Home Fleet Training Squadron, replacing the battleship . In July 1948, Victorious was deployed to Portland Harbour in support of the sailing events at the 1948 London Olympic Games. In 1949 she was refitted at Rosyth and took part in several training cruises and Home Fleet exercises.

The ship was extensively reconstructed and modernised at Portsmouth Dockyard between 1950 and 1958.  This took over eight years because of frequent design changes to allow for new technologies. And in particular, the decision in 1953 that she would have to have her original steam turbines replaced, to be viable past 1964, which meant much work had to be redone, and a new flight deck installed twice over.  The cost of the reconstruction increased from 5 million pounds to 30 million pounds creating what was in many respects a new ship.  Her hull was widened, deepened, and lengthened; her machinery was replaced with Foster-Wheeler boilers; her hangar height was increased; new armament of 3 inch (76 mm) guns was installed; a fully angled flight deck (of 8 degrees) and steam catapults were added. Her radar equipment was extensively altered to include up to date equipment, and included the first type 984 3-D radar system to be installed on a ship. While it was hoped she could operate a full air group of 50 aircraft, the rapid increase in size of the jets coming into service limited her to operating no more than 28 aircraft (including helicopters).

On 25 September 1958 Commander J. D. Russell drowned in his Supermarine Scimitar after a failed attempt to land on Victorious for the first time after her refit. Although the landing hook engaged the arrestor wire, the wire itself snapped due to improper rigging and the aircraft then rolled slowly over the side. It sank very slowly, but the plane-guard helicopter crew couldn't release the pilot, and it was seen that Cdr Russell had opened his canopy and then closed it again, possibly an effect of gravity on the heavy frame. The other seven Scimitars in the stream diverted away to Yeovilton.

In 1960, after recommissioning into the Home Fleet on 14 January 1958, with work-ups and deployments in the Atlantic and Mediterranean Sea, she portrayed both herself and HMS Ark Royal during the filming of the British film Sink the Bismarck!.  This was despite post-war modifications significantly altering her appearance – the addition of an angled deck and a Type 984 "searchlight" radar. The actor Kenneth More who had served aboard Victorious as a junior officer, played a fictitious Admiralty Director of Operations.  He is shown giving the order to detach Victorious from Convoy WS 8B, which was forming in the River Clyde in order to move almost 20,000 troops to the Middle East.

Victorious took part in Operation Vantage in support of Kuwait in July 1961. Later in 1961 she would sail to join the Far East Fleet. In 1964, she provided support for the newly independent state of Malaysia against territorial expansion by its neighbour, Indonesia. Her passage through the Sunda Strait caused the Sunda Straits Crisis between August and September 1964, which was settled peacefully when Indonesia agreed to allow Victorious to return through the Lombok Strait.

General characteristics after reconstruction 

General characteristics of Victorious after reconstruction.

Decommissioning 

On 11 November 1967, after the completion of the 1967 refit and shortly before the start of what was intended as the ship's final commission, there was a relatively small fire, which was rapidly extinguished, in the chief petty officers' mess (resulting in one death and two hospitalisations). Although damage was relatively minor, the fire coincided with a reduction of the defence budget and a manpower shortage for the Royal Navy. Together with the 1966 decision to phase out fixed-wing naval aviation, it was decided at very short notice not to recommission Victorious. Her captain was told of this just one day before the scheduled recommissioning ceremony. The ceremony was held by the ship's crew anyway as a "wake" for the ship.  She was paid off in 1968 and placed on the Disposal List in 1969. She was sold later that year to British Shipbreakers and towed on 13 July 1969 to Faslane Naval Base, where she was broken up.

During her service, HMS Victorious had been deployed in most parts of the world.

Squadrons and aircraft

Models
Airfix produce a 1/600 scale construction kit of Victorious.

Footnotes

References

Bibliography

External links

 Armoured aircraft carrier action and damage reports, 1940–1945
 .

Illustrious-class aircraft carriers
Ships built on the River Tyne
1939 ships
World War II aircraft carriers of the United Kingdom
Cold War aircraft carriers of the United Kingdom
Ships built by Vickers Armstrong
World War II aircraft carriers of the United States